The Cathedral of the Immaculate Conception is a Catholic cathedral in Memphis, Tennessee, United States.  It is the seat of the Diocese of Memphis.  The parish buildings are contributing properties in the Central Gardens Historic District.  It was listed on the National Register of Historic Places in 1982.

History

Immaculate Conception Parish
Immaculate Conception parish was established by Bishop Thomas Sebastian Byrne of the Diocese of Nashville in 1921.  It was the ninth parish in Memphis.  Msgr. Dennis J. Murphy was appointed as the parish's first pastor.  He built a three-story brick building that served as a combination church and school.  It continues to serve the parish today as its school building.  The Sisters of Mercy made up the school's first faculty.

Construction of the present church building was begun in 1927.  Richard J. Regan of Regan and Weller Architects was chosen to design the church.  The lower crypt was initially built and used as the church for ten years before the upper church was built.  The church was dedicated on July 31, 1938.  The parish's second pastor, Msgr. Francis D. Grady, had the decorative design work completed on the church's interior.  Msgr. Merlin F. Kearney had the high school buildings east of the church built in the 1950s and 1960s.  Immaculate Conception High School for girls was also begun at this time.

Cathedral of the Immaculate Conception
Pope Paul VI established the Diocese of Memphis on January 6, 1971.  Immaculate Conception was named as the new diocese's cathedral.  A major renovation of the cathedral was completed in 2001 and was dedicated by Bishop J. Terry Steib, SVD on December 8 of that year.  In 2011 there were 800 families in the parish and 430 students in the school

Architecture
The cathedral is a Spanish Colonial Revival style structure. It is cruciform in shape, and measures . The steel structure is covered with buff brick trimmed with Indiana limestone. The main facade features three round arch entrance portals, a rose window, and a stone cross on the central pediment. Two towers flank the main facade. There are two other rose windows, one in each transept.

See also
List of Catholic cathedrals in the United States
List of cathedrals in the United States
Immaculate Conception Cathedral School

References

External links

 Official Cathedral Site
Diocese of Memphis Official Site

1921 establishments in Tennessee
Churches in Memphis, Tennessee
Christian organizations established in 1921
Immaculate Conception (Memphis, Tennessee)
Roman Catholic churches completed in 1938
Roman Catholic Diocese of Memphis
Spanish Revival architecture in Tennessee
Historic district contributing properties in Tennessee
Churches on the National Register of Historic Places in Tennessee
20th-century Roman Catholic church buildings in the United States